Jiban Trishna (English: Thirst for Life) is a 1957 Indian Bengali-language drama film directed and screenplay by the famous director Asit Sen. The story of the film was written by Ashutosh Mukherjee. This film is made under the banner of Badal Pictures. The music of the film is composed by the legendary Bhupen Hazarika. It stars Uttam Kumar, Suchitra Sen, and Bikash Roy in the lead roles.

Plot
A poor orphan artist Shakuntala (Suchitra) is wooed by a notorious womanizer Rajnath Samanta(Uttam), only son of a celebrated doctor and millionaire (Pahadi Sanyal). Shakuntala's parents, gave shelter to a woman and an infant male-child. After their death, this boy, Deep Kamal, took responsibility of the girl and took the role of her elder brother. He has a mixed feeling about Rajnath- he hates his millionaire and would do anything, even con-act, to deprive him of it, but as a person he likes him. Shakuntala is indifferent to be associated with him, since she feels in his life there is no 'need' of her. What would happen when the Samanta family mystery unravels and it comes out that Deepkamal is actually Dr Samanta's biological son, whose wife left with the child? The hating Deep now wants not a share of, but full property, in exchange of not opening family skeleton. Parallelly runs another sub-plot of Sabita (Dipti Ray) who stays with her FIL (Jahar Ganguli) and small child (Master Shaibal) - whose husband doesn't keep any contact with her or even his father except occasional letters. Why? What went wrong between them? With a hint of tenderness growing between this deserted wife and Deep Kamal. A beautifully crafted story - repeated in a few movies later - in two parts in fact, (Dipti's story is treated as a full movie in a few) but not so poignantly - with all around excellent performance by all, even Bhanu was restrained.

Cast
 Uttam Kumar as Rajnath Samanta
 Bikash Roy as Deep Kamal
 Chandrabati Devi
 Suchitra Sen as Shakuntala
 Pahari Sanyal
 Bhanu Bandopadhyay

Soundtrack

References

External links
 
 Jiban Trishna in Gomolo

1957 films
Bengali-language Indian films
1950s Bengali-language films
Films scored by Bhupen Hazarika
Films based on works by Ashutosh Mukhopadhyay